Wonderful Ethiopians of the Ancient Cushite Empire is a book by Drusilla Dunjee Houston published in 1926. The book examines the history of the Cushite civilization of Africa. 

The book is considered to have been inspired by W.E.B. Du Bois's 1915 book The Negro.

References

External links 
Wonderful Ethiopians of the Ancient Cushite Empire (entire text)

1926 non-fiction books
Kingdom of Kush